Vivione Pass Passo (Italian Passo del Vivione) is a mountain pass that links Schilpario in Val di Scalve with Paisco Loveno in Val Camonica.
The road was built during World War I to supply troops in the nearby Adamello. Vivione Pass has a height of 1828 m and is usually closed for snow from December to May, the road is not larger than 2 meters but is paved.

See also
 List of highest paved roads in Europe
 List of mountain passes

References 

Mountain passes of Italy
Mountain passes of the Alps